The 2015 Women's NORCECA Volleyball Championship was the 24th edition of the tournament, played from 27 September to 2 October 2015 in Michoacan, Mexico. The United States defeated 3-1 to the Dominican Republic to win the Continental Championship and both qualified, along with Puerto Rico and Canada, to the NORCECA Olympic Qualifier while American Nicole Fawcett earned the Most Valuable Player award.

Competing nations
The following national teams have qualified:

Squads

Pool standing procedure
 Number of matches won
 Match points
 Points ratio
 Sets ratio
 Result of the last match between the tied teams

Match won 3–0: 5 match points for the winner, 0 match points for the loser
Match won 3–1: 4 match points for the winner, 1 match point for the loser
Match won 3–2: 3 match points for the winner, 2 match points for the loser

Preliminary round

Pool A

Pool B

Final round

Quarterfinals

Classification 5th–8th places

Semifinals

Seventh place match

Fifth place match

Bronze medal match

Final

Final standing

All-Star team

Most Valuable Player

Best Outside Hitters

Best Middle Blockers

Best Setter

Best Opposite

Best Scorer

Best Server

Best Libero

Best Digger

Best Receiver

References

External links

2015 in Mexican women's sports
NORCECA
21st century in Michoacán
International volleyball competitions hosted by Mexico
October 2015 sports events in Mexico
September 2015 sports events in Mexico
Sport in Michoacán
Women's NORCECA Volleyball Championship